Jean La Lime or Lalime (died June 17, 1812) was a trader from Quebec, Canada who worked in what became the Northwest Territory of the United States. He worked as an agent for William Burnett, also of Canada, to sell to the Native Americans and take furs in exchange. He was among the first European permanent settlers in Chicago. He was killed there in 1812, in what was called the "first murder in Chicago", by John Kinzie, a trading partner of Burnett who was another early settler from Canada.

Background
During the time of the American Revolutionary War, France joined the cause of the Americans against the British. Because of this, in their Canadian territories, the British treated those of French heritage more harshly. Several families, the first two being the families of Jean La Lime and Antoinne Ouillemette, fled to the Eschikagou (Chicago) area to escape the harsh treatment. After trading along the frontier and likely in Detroit, La Lime arrived in the Chicago area on August 17, 1792 as an agent for William Burnett of Canada. In 1800, he purchased the homestead of Jean Baptiste Point du Sable for Burnett for 6,000 livres. The bill of sale was filed in Detroit, Michigan on September 18, 1800, although dated in Chicago on May 7 of that year.

By 1804, Burnett's partner, John Kinzie, who also settled in Chicago, had bought the former du Sable house. He lived there with his wife and first child. They had three other children born in Chicago.

After the Americans established Fort Dearborn in 1804, La Lime worked there as an interpreter, aiding communication between the Americans and Indians. He broke his leg in 1809 and, as it was improperly set, was left lame.

On June 17, 1812 in Chicago, La Lime and Kinzie quarreled, and Kinzie killed him. Kinzie fled to Milwaukee, then in Indian territory. He claimed La Lime had shot at him and he had stabbed the interpreter in self-defense. Historians have speculated that La Lime was acting as an informant on the corrupt economic activities within the fort,  and Kinzie killed him to silence him. It has been also proposed the Kinzie's attempted to cover up the families early real estate transactions, substituting Francis May as the original owner (who died after eating at the son's [James] home).

La Lime was originally buried within sight of Kinzie's house, as the European settlement was  thinly strung along Lake Michigan. Kinzie maintained the gravesite. After he died in 1828, his son John H. Kinzie had La Lime's remains exhumed and reinterred in the churchyard of St. James Church.

In 1891, a coffin was discovered at Wabash Avenue and Illinois Street near the Rush Street Bridge. Based on the research of Joseph Kirkland, the bones inside were believed to be La Lime's. The remains are held by the Chicago History Museum.

References 

  "History of Jean-Baptiste Pointe DuSable," DuSable Heritage Association, on line.

1812 deaths
Pre-Confederation Canadian expatriates in the United States
People from Chicago
People murdered in Illinois
Male murder victims
American murder victims
Deaths by stabbing in Illinois
Year of birth unknown